The lighthouse at Kapelludden, on the east coast of the Swedish island of Öland, was built and lit in 1871. It is located in a wetland near the ruin of a 13th-century chapel, in Bredsättra socken, Borgholm Municipality.

The lighthouse is 32 meters high and was built by A.T. Gellerstedt.

See also

 List of lighthouses and lightvessels in Sweden
Långe Erik, the lighthouse at the north cape of Öland
Långe Jan, the lighthouse at the south cape of Öland

References

External links

 Sjofartsverket  
 The Swedish Lighthouse Society

Lighthouses completed in 1871
Lighthouses in Sweden
Öland